Lasso Coulibaly (born 19 October 2002) is an Ivorian professional footballer who plays as a midfielder for FC Nordsjælland.

Career 
Coulibaly started his career with Right to Dream Academy before joining FC Nordsjælland. He made his debut on 18 July 2021 in a 2–1 loss to Viborg FF.

References

External links 

Living people
2002 births
Association football forwards
Ghanaian footballers
Right to Dream Academy players
Danish Superliga players
FC Nordsjælland players
Ghanaian expatriate footballers
Ghanaian expatriate sportspeople in Denmark
Expatriate men's footballers in Denmark